Alán García Chávez (born 27 April 1993) is a Mexican professional footballer who plays for Tlaxcala F.C.  of Liga Premier de México on loan from Necaxa.

Honours

Club
Chapulineros de Oaxaca
 Liga de Balompié Mexicano: 2021

References

External links
 
 

1993 births
Living people
Association football midfielders
Mexican footballers
Club Necaxa footballers
Pioneros de Cancún footballers
Tlaxcala F.C. players
Ascenso MX players
Liga Premier de México players
Liga de Balompié Mexicano players
Footballers from Mexico City